Vladimir Barchukov (born 9 October 1984) is a Russian ski orienteering competitor.

He won a bronze medal in the long distance at the 2011 World Ski Orienteering Championships.

References

1984 births
Living people
Russian orienteers
Ski-orienteers
21st-century Russian people